The Anguilla United Front is an alliance of political parties in Anguilla. 
At elections, 21 February 2005, the alliance won 38.9% of popular votes and  4 out of 7 elected seats.

The Anguilla United Front (AUF) was created on 7 January 2000 as a political and electoral partnership, when an agreement, The United Front Agreement, was signed by the Chairmen and Political Leaders of the Anguilla National Alliance and the Anguilla Democratic Party, on behalf of the executive and rank and file members of the two parties. The full title of the United Front Partnership as set out in the Agreement is United Front for the Restoration of Democracy, Good Governance, Peace, Political Stability and Economic Prosperity to Anguilla.

The AUF under the political leadership of the Honourable Osbourne Fleming presented itself to the Anguilla electorate as a partnership in the campaign for the general elections held shortly thereafter, not as a traditional coalition of two political parties to contest elections.

The AUF, when it took over the reins of the Anguilla Government in 2000, brought to the administration of the Government of Anguilla considerable experience gained from the participation of its elected leadership in various governments dating back to 1981. In 2000, the AUF ministers who formed the Government following the February elections had between them at least 35 years of service as ministers in various Anguilla Governments.

Electoral results

References

External links
Official web site
Defunct web site

Political parties in Anguilla
2000 establishments in Anguilla
Conservative parties in British Overseas Territories
Political parties established in 2000